Shi Bao may refer to the following people:

 Shi Bao (Three Kingdoms) (石苞) (197 - 272 or 273), military general who served the Cao Wei state and Jin Dynasty (266–420)
 Shi Bao (石寶), a fictional character in the novel Water Margin (see List of Water Margin characters#Fang La forces)